Percy Royal Thomas Bates (12 April 1913 – 7 April 1998) was an Australian rules footballer who played with St Kilda in the Victorian Football League (VFL).

Notes

External links 

1913 births
1998 deaths
Australian rules footballers from Victoria (Australia)
St Kilda Football Club players
Caulfield Football Club players